Aurel Pantea (born 10 March 1952) is a Romanian poet and literary critic.

Born in Chețani, Mureș County into a family of peasants, Pantea attended the Faculty  of Letters of the Babeș-Bolyai University in Cluj, graduating in 1976. During the university years he collaborated with the magazine Equinox. After graduation, he taught at Borșa and Alba Iulia. Since 1989 he is the director of the magazine Vatra, and since 1990 he is the director of the magazine Discobolul. He is a member of the Writers' Union of Romania.

Body of works
 Poetry

  Casa cu retori, București, Editura Albatros, 1980.
 Persoana de după-amiază, Cluj, Editura Dacia, 1983. 
 La persoana a treia, București, Editura Cartea Românească, 1992. 
 Negru pe negru, Tg. Mureș, Editura Arhipelag, 1993. 
 Aceste veneții, aceste lagune, Bacău, Editura Axa, 1995. 
 O victorie covârșitoare, Pitești, Editura Paralela 45, 1996. 
 Negru pe negru (alt poem), Cluj, Editura Casa Cărții de Știință, 2005.

Literary critic
 Poeți ai transcendenței pline, Cluj, Editura Casa Cărții de Știință,  2003.
 Simpatii critice, Cluj, Editura Casa Cărții de Știință, 2004. 
 Înapoi la lirism (o anchetă), Tg. Mureș, Editura Ardealul, 2005. 
 Ștefan Aug. Doinaș (studiu monografic), Cluj, Editura Limes, 2007.
 Sacrul în poezia românească (volum colectiv), Cluj, Editura Casa Cărții de Știință, 2007.

References

Further reading
 Mircea Zaciu, Marian Papahagi, Aurel Sasu. Dicționarul scriitorilor români, M-Q. Editura Albatros, 2001. .
 Manuela Anton, Tiberiu Avramescu, Șerban Axinte. Dicționar general al literaturii române, Vol. 5. Editura Univers Enciclopedic, 2006. .

1952 births
Living people
People from Mureș County
Babeș-Bolyai University alumni
Romanian poets
Romanian male poets
Romanian literary critics